Choe Hyo-sim (최효심;  or  ; born 5 December 1993) is a North Korean weightlifter. She competed at the 2016 Summer Olympics in Rio de Janeiro, and won a silver medal in the women's 63 kg. She won the silver medal at the 2013 Summer Universiade.

Choe represents the Kigwancha Sports Club.

Major results

References

External links

1993 births
Living people
Olympic weightlifters of North Korea
Weightlifters at the 2016 Summer Olympics
Olympic silver medalists for North Korea
Medalists at the 2016 Summer Olympics
Olympic medalists in weightlifting
North Korean female weightlifters
Universiade medalists in weightlifting
Asian Games medalists in weightlifting
Weightlifters at the 2018 Asian Games
Medalists at the 2018 Asian Games
Asian Games silver medalists for North Korea
Universiade silver medalists for North Korea
World Weightlifting Championships medalists
Medalists at the 2013 Summer Universiade
21st-century North Korean women